Hatya is a 2004 Hindi-language fantasy film directed by Kader Kashmiri. The film stars Akshay Kumar, Navin Nischol, Reema Lagoo and Varsha Usgaonkar in lead roles with Rajendra Gupta, Raza Murad and Rajesh Vivek in supporting roles.

Plot
Ravi Lal (Akshay Kumar) lives a wealthy lifestyle with his father Ratanlal (Navin Nischol), his mother Seema (Reema Lagoo) and with his sister. Meanwhile, Ravi has fallen in love with Kavita (Varsha Usgaonkar), and they get married. Ratan Lal is killed by businessman Murugan (Rajendra Gupta) after turning down the offer of various land and royalties. Ravi witnesses his father's brutal end and is injured badly by Murugan's men and is hospitalized. Soon Kavita notices that Ravi has changed... He is more quiet and brooding. Kavita eventually suspects that Ravi is having an affair. But what she doesn't know is that.. he was already killed, and his body transformed into a shape-changing venomous snake. Now out for revenge, he sets out to kill Murugan.

Cast
Akshay Kumar - Ravi Lal
Navin Nischol - Ratan Lal 
Reema Lagoo - Mrs. R. Lal 
Laxmikant Berde - Bhandari(90s)
Varsha Usgaonkar - Kavita Jaiswal 
Rajendra Gupta - Murugan
Rajesh Vivek - Snake Charmer
Johnny Lever - Paid Mourner
Raza Murad-Bhandari(2004)
Dinyar Contractor
Sudhir - Johny
Pankaj Berry - Babu Rokde

Soundtrack

The film was average in terms of collection. However, its soundtrack was very popular. Music was composed by the popular music director duo Nadeem-Sharvan.

Critical response
Subhash K. Jha had criticised the film story and direction, terming as "murder" for every aesthetic value in cinema.

References

External links
 

2000s fantasy action films
Indian films about revenge
2000s fantasy drama films
Indian fantasy action films
2000s Hindi-language films
Films scored by Nadeem–Shravan
2000s vigilante films
Indian vigilante films
Indian fantasy drama films
Dark fantasy films
2004 drama films
2004 films
Indian supernatural films
Indian dark fantasy films